Fuse Universal Ltd. is a company based in Shoreditch, London, United Kingdom. It was founded in 2008 by Steve Dineen, the C.E.O. 

In 2019, 55 employees made the organisation. The main product is the Fuse platform, entirely cloud-based using Amazon Web Services build on Ruby on Rails and available on all devices supporting iOS and Android systems.

As well as the platform, Fuse Universal offers professional services such as Fuse Create and Fuse Consult. Fuse Universal runs its foundation called Fuse School, a non-profit arm of the organisation offering educational videos to children and adults worldwide via YouTube and the Fuse School (also written "FuseSchool") platform.

History 

Founder of Fuse, Steve Dineen, began work at Ingram Micro in pre-sales consultancy until given the opportunity to pursue training and teaching via high-end systems. Afterwards, he founded eLearning Company Fuel which was subsequently sold 10 years later to a U.S. compliance and ethics Company in 2007.

The main product, the Fuse platform, evolved from the Fuse School. This is a foundation and charity, established in 2008, helping to share free of charge Maths, English and I.C.T. secondary school curricula worldwide.

Two years later, in 2010, the platform sold on licenses and released Fuse under Fusion Universal. After two and half years of operating in the market, the company was renamed Fuse Universal.

Products and services

Fuse 
Fuse is a cloud based platform that allows individuals to capture and share knowledge, questions and ideas in video, audio or text format.  The purpose of the software is to increase information accessibility within a company by recording and sharing examples of best practice or discussions from experts in the same industry.

The Fuse platform can be accessed from an internet enabled device, such as a smartphone, tablet, computer or laptop.

References 

Companies based in the London Borough of Tower Hamlets
Education in Europe